Jacky Dorsey (born December 18, 1954) is a retired professional basketball player who spent three seasons in the National Basketball Association (NBA) with the Denver Nuggets (1977–78), the Portland Trail Blazers (1977–78), the Houston Rockets (1978–79), and the Seattle SuperSonics (1980–81). While in college he was listed as 6'8". He wore jersey number 44. He was drafted during the second round (26th overall) by the New Orleans Jazz from the University of Georgia.  He was a nearly unstoppable shooter in Strat-O-Matic basketball.

External links

1954 births
Living people
American expatriate basketball people in Italy
American expatriate basketball people in Venezuela
American men's basketball players
Basketball players from Atlanta
Denver Nuggets players
Georgia Bulldogs basketball players
Houston Rockets players
Maine Lumberjacks players
New Orleans Jazz draft picks
Parade High School All-Americans (boys' basketball)
Portland Trail Blazers players
Seattle SuperSonics players
Small forwards
American expatriate basketball people in the Philippines
Barangay Ginebra San Miguel players
Philippine Basketball Association imports